"Going Through the Motions" is a song by American singer-songwriter Aimee Mann, which was released in 2005 as the lead single from her fifth studio album The Forgotten Arm. The song was written by Mann and produced by Joe Henry. "Going Through the Motions" peaked at No. 18 in the US Billboard Adult Alternative Songs chart.

Background
"Going Through the Motions" is one of a number of tracks on The Forgotten Arm to be based on the subject of substance abuse. The song was inspired by Mann's own experience with a friend who was addicted to crack cocaine and suffered a number of post-treatment relapses. Mann said about the song's inspiration to Womanrock.com in 2005, "It was like a phone call I had with him, where he was out of treatment, in a half way house, and was super manic and you just know. He relapsed shortly after that."

Critical reception
In a review of The Forgotten Arm, Patrick Berkery of The Philadelphia Inquirer described "Going Through the Motions" as "typical of Mann's better songs: catchy yet fatalistic". Jim Farber of the Daily News wrote, "Mann has some strong musical moments. 'Going Through the Motions' shows her flair for power-pop." Trouser Press considered the song to be one of three songs on The Forgotten Arm that are "immediately engrossing".

Zeth Lundy of PopMatters felt the song, along with "Clean Up for Christmas", deals with "addictions [that] are confronted but never resolved". In a review of Mann's 2005 concert at the Royce Hall, Steven Mirkin of Variety said of the song, "'Going Through the Motions' — a kissoff to a junkie lover — is wonderfully balanced between short and long phrases, the lyrics finely honed couplets dipped in poison."

Track listing
CD single (promo)
"Going Through the Motions" – 2:57

Personnel
Going Through the Motions
 Aimee Mann – lead vocals, guitar
 Chris Bruce, Julian Coryell – guitar
 Jebin Bruni – keyboards
 Paul Bryan – bass, backing vocals
 Jay Bellerose – drums

Production
 Joe Henry – producer
 Ryan Freeland – mixing, recording
 Chris Reynolds, Jason Mott – assistant engineers
 Gavin Lurssen – mastering

Charts

References

2005 songs
2005 singles
Aimee Mann songs
Songs written by Aimee Mann
V2 Records singles